One California Day is a 2007 documentary film about surfing shot in six coastal regions in California. Directed by Mark Jeremias and Jason Baffa, the film looks at the experience of California surfing from Crescent City to Imperial Beach. The film was shot in super 16mm color film.

Surfers featured
(In alphabetical order)
Lance Carson
Joe Curren
Jimmy Gamboa
Tyler Hatzikian
Devon Howard
Alex Knost
Chris, Dan and Keith Malloy
Dane Perlee
Joel Tudor
Tyler Warren

References

External links
 onecaliforniaday.com site

Documentary films about surfing
Films shot in California
American surfing films
Surfing in California
Films set in California